Henry Javier Romero Ventura (born September 17, 1991) is a  Salvadoran professional footballer who plays as a defender for Primera División club Alianza.

Club career

Alianza
Romero signed with Alianza for the Apertura 2017 tournament. On 14 September 2017, he scored his first goal for Alianza in a 4–0 win against Municipal Limeño at the Estadio Cuscatlán.

On 8 December 2018, Romero was sent off in the second leg of the semifinals of the Apertura 2018, a 2–2 draw against FAS. However, Alianza reached its fifth consecutive final since the Apertura 2016.

With Alianza, Romero won the Apertura 2017 and Clausura 2018.

International career
During a 2017 CONCACAF Gold Cup match against the United States, Romero bit Jozy Altidore and was suspended six matches.

International goals
Scores and results list El Salvador's goal tally first.

Honours

Club 
Águila
 Primera División
 Champion: Clausura 2012
 Runners-up: Apertura 2014, Clausura 2016

Alianza FC
 Primera División
 Champion: Apertura 2017, Clausura 2018
 Runners-up: Clausura 2017, Apertura 2018

References

External links
 

1991 births
Living people
Salvadoran footballers
El Salvador international footballers
C.D. Águila footballers
2015 CONCACAF Gold Cup players
2017 Copa Centroamericana players
2017 CONCACAF Gold Cup players
Association football defenders